Paul Warner is an American film and theatre director. He is based in New York. He directed Fall Time and In the Name of the Father. In June 2013 he was a resident artist at the Baryshnikov Arts Center. In January 2018 Warner directed the movie musical Kaya: Taste of Paradise.

In January 2018, Warner directed an original movie musical, starring Okieriete Onaodowan. He directed Hamlet/Horatio which premiered in June 2021.

Filmography 

 2021 Hamlet/Horatio as director
 2018 Kaya: Taste of Paradise as director.
 2011 Portraits in Dramatic Time as co-director
 1995 Fall Time - as director.
 2001 Beyond the Pale - as director, writer.

References

External links

Living people
Film directors from New York (state)
People from New York (state)
Place of birth missing (living people)
Year of birth missing (living people)